Casey Smith (born April 20, 1985) is an American professional stock car racing driver. He last competed part-time in the NASCAR Camping World Truck Series, driving the No. 45 for Niece Motorsports.

Racing career
Smith made his NASCAR debut in 2016, driving the No. 07 Chevrolet Silverado for SS-Green Light Racing at Iowa and he finished 22nd. He returned later that season at Martinsville behind the wheel of the No. 45 Chevrolet Silverado for newly-created Niece Motorsports but he failed to qualify. Then Smith and Niece returned for the following week's race at Texas and finished 23rd.

Motorsports career results

NASCAR
(key) (Bold – Pole position awarded by qualifying time. Italics – Pole position earned by points standings or practice time. * – Most laps led.)

Camping World Truck Series

References

External links
 

1985 births
NASCAR drivers
Sportspeople from Austin, Texas
Living people
Racing drivers from Austin, Texas
Racing drivers from Texas